The Tahiti women's national basketball team represents Tahiti in international competitions. The team has won several gold medals at the Pacific Games, including at the inaugural women's tournament in 1966. It is managed by the Fédération Tahitienne de Basketball.

See also

Tahiti national basketball team (for men)

References

Sources

Women's national basketball teams
Basketball